Giovanni Francesco Caroto (1480 – 1555 or 1558) was an Italian painter of the Renaissance
active mainly in his native city of Verona.

He initially apprenticed under Liberale da Verona (1445–1526/1529), a conservative painter infused with the style of Mantegna, but after a stay in Milan, Caroto began responding to the other influences from Francesco Bonsignori, Leonardo da Vinci, Raphael, and Giulio Romano; but he never lost a certain individuality and his rich Veronese colour. He trained prominent Mannerist painter Paolo Veronese, who was active mainly in Venice, as well as Antonio Badile.

Examples of his art are in the Castello, Milan, the Chiesa de Carità, Mantua, in the Uffizi and Pitti, Florence, and in the museums of Dresden, Budapest, etc. His works are sometimes confused with those of his brother Giovanni, who was also a painter. Both were buried in Santa Maria in Organo in Verona.

Caroto's Portrait of a Child with a Drawing, circa 1520, motivated the early naming of Angelman Syndrome as puppet syndrome by Harry Angelman.

Notes

External links

References
 

1480 births
1550s deaths
15th-century Italian painters
Italian male painters
16th-century Italian painters
Painters from Verona
Italian Renaissance painters